Melanodytes pustulatus is a species of beetle in the family Dytiscidae, the only species in the genus Melanodytes.

References

Dytiscidae